Highland Park United Methodist Church is a United Methodist church in Dallas, Texas.

Location
It is located on the campus of Southern Methodist University, at 3300 Mockingbird Lane, Dallas, TX 75205.

History
In February 1916, a Methodist congregation met on the campus of Southern Methodist University for the first time to worship together. It was organized as a congregation of the Methodist Episcopal Church, South (MECS).  It was initially named University MECS, but by the fall of that year, the student congregation joined Methodists in the newly forming Town of Highland Park and the church was renamed Highland Park MECS. A year later, in 1917, a temporary church building called "The Little Brown Church" was erected.

 The current sanctuary was designed by architect Mark Lemmon (1889–1975) and Roscoe DeWitt (1894-1975) and built in 1927. The first service in the sanctuary was held on February 6, 1927, when Dr Umphrey Lee  served as the pastor.  The Great Depression came and it took 15 years to pay off the debt.  When it was paid, the church building was dedicated in 1943.  Additions to the Highland Park Methodist sanctuary were made in 1951, 1961, 1983, 2003 and 2018.

Dr. Lee left Highland Park Methodist in 1936 and was followed by Dr. Marshall Steel, who served from 1936 to 1957.  Following Dr. Steel, Dr. William Dickinson served from 1958 to 1972.  He was followed by Dr. Leighton K. Farrell, the church's longest serving minister, who was appointed in 1972 and served as senior pastor through 1995.

In 1995, Mark Craig became Senior Minister. Since 2013, Rev Paul Rasmussen has served as the Senior Minister.

In 2010, after much restoration, the Munger Place Church located at 5200 Bryan St, Dallas, TX 75206 in the Munger Place Historic District, Old East Dallas became the East Dallas satellite of the Highland Park United Methodist Church.

As of 2020, it has 15,078 members and organizes missions to sixteen countries worldwide, including Costa Rica, Haiti, Nigeria and Nepal. It also sponsors over six hundred inner-city children to attend summer camp every year.

In 2017, HPUMC launched a new campus in North Dallas, The Grove Church located at 4525 Rickover Dr, Dallas, TX 75244.

In 2019, The Beyond Campaign concluded and built a multipurpose 65,000 square foot youth and DisABILITY ministry building. The building is three stories. The bottom hosts a state of the art disability program with sensory rooms. During the week, Chances coffee shop, led by members with disabilities, serves coffee and pie. The second floor has a youth arcade, gaming center, cafe, art center, and nearly twenty multipurpose rooms. The third floor hosts a basketball gym and a worship center.

In 2020, HPUMC announced the launching of a new church that will meet in the House of Blues. It will be one of the first churches planted, planned, started, and led by two women. This is a breakthrough for the modern era. The church is called Uptown Church

Notable church-goers
Former Dallas Mayor Robert L. Thornton (1880 - 1964) was active and raised his family in the church. 
Dallas business man Jack Lowe Sr. (1913 - 1980) was active and raised his family in the church.  He was active in the effort to peacefully integrate Dallas schools in the 1960s and 1970s and was attracted to the church by the preaching of Dr. Bill Dickinson.
Former American President George W. Bush attended the church from 1989 to 1995. He volunteered in a ministry to help low-income, mostly Hispanic families. He has attended since his Presidency concluded. He currently is a member and attends regularly.
American football player and coach Tom Landry (1924-2000) attended the church.
CEO of American Airlines, Doug Parker, is an active member of the church.

References

Southern Methodist University
Churches in Dallas
United Methodist churches in Texas
George W. Bush